The 1978 NCAA Division II football season, part of college football in the United States organized by the National Collegiate Athletic Association at the Division II level, began in August 1978, and concluded with the NCAA Division II Football Championship in December 1978 at Lobo Stadium in Longview, Texas. The Eastern Illinois Panthers defeated the Delaware Fightin' Blue Hens, 10–9, to win their first Division II national title.

Conference realignment

Conference changes
 Five conferences, the Big Sky Conference, Mid-Eastern Athletic Conference, Ohio Valley Conference, Southwestern Athletic Conference, and Yankee Conference, transitioned from Division II to the newly-established Division I-AA level of college football. All of their members, alongside eight independents, departed at the same time.
 This was the first season for the Mid-Continent Conference, which was formed by six teams from Illinois, Iowa, Michigan, and Ohio.
 This was the first season for the Heartland Collegiate Conference, which was formed by eight teams from Kentucky, Indiana, and Ohio. All of the Indiana-based members were formerly part of the Indiana Collegiate Conference, which dropped football after the prior season.

Membership changes

Conference standings

Conference summaries

 While the Southern Intercollegiate Athletic Conference (SIAC) was a Division II conference, Florida A&M (FAMU) had successfully petitioned the NCAA for Division I classification (Division I-AA in football), which took effect on September 1, 1978. FAMU subsequently competed in the 1978 Division I-AA postseason, winning the Division I-AA championship.

Postseason

The 1978 NCAA Division II Football Championship playoffs were the sixth single-elimination tournament to determine the national champion of men's NCAA Division II college football. The championship game was held at Lobo Stadium in Longview, Texas for the first time.

Playoff bracket

See also
1978 NCAA Division I-A football season
1978 NCAA Division I-AA football season
1978 NCAA Division III football season
1978 NAIA Division I football season
1978 NAIA Division II football season

References